Apamea vultuosa, the airy apamea, is a moth of the family Noctuidae native to North America.

Description
Adults are on wing from June to July depending on the location. The larvae feed on grasses in the family Poaceae.

Subspecies
Apamea vultuosa multicolor (Dyar, 1904) 
Apamea vultuosa vultuosa (Grote, 1875)

External links

Apamea (moth)
Moths of North America
Moths described in 1875
Taxa named by Augustus Radcliffe Grote